Sa Bot is a district (amphoe) in the northern part of Lopburi province, central Thailand.

History
The minor district (king amphoe) was created on 5 June 1981, by separating tambons Sa Bot, Maha Phot, and Tha Thung Chang of Khok Samrong district. It was upgraded to full district status on 1 January 1988.

Geography
Neighbouring districts are (from the north clockwise) Khok Charoen, Chai Badan, Khok Samrong and Nong Muang.

Administration
The district is divided into five sub-districts (tambons), which are further subdivided into 46 villages (mubans). Sa Bot itself has township (thesaban tambon) status and covers all of the tambon Sa Bot. There are three tambon administrative organizations (TAO): Sa Bot, Maha Phot and Niyom Chai.

References

External links
amphoe.com

Sa Bot